Elijah "Eli" Lockaby (born December 18, 1995) is an American former professional soccer player who last played as a defender or midfielder for USL League One club Forward Madison FC.

Career

Youth and college
Lockaby played college soccer for Virginia Commonwealth University. He was redshirted his freshman year, and his final four years of eligibility was a starter. Lockaby made 72 appearances for the Rams, scoring twice.

Lockaby played in USL League Two, for three seasons, then known as the Premier Development League. During the 2015 and 2016 seasons, he spent time with Orlando City U-23. During the 2017 PDL season Lockaby played with the Des Moines Menace. Lockaby made 13 appearances with the Menace.

Professional
On January 18, 2019, Lockaby signed a one-year contract with the Richmond Kickers. On March 30, 2019, Lockaby made his professional debut for the Kickers against Lansing Ignite FC, starting the match.

Lockaby moved to USL League One club Forward Madison FC on February 4, 2020.

References

External links
 
 Eli Lockaby at VCU Athletics
 

1995 births
Living people
American soccer players
Association football midfielders
VCU Rams men's soccer players
Des Moines Menace players
Orlando City U-23 players
Richmond Kickers players
Forward Madison FC players
Soccer players from Orlando, Florida
USL League One players
USL League Two players
Association football defenders